Gunnar von Hohenthal (15 November 1880 – 23 June 1966) was a Finnish modern pentathlete. He competed for Russia at the 1912 Summer Olympics. He was also Lieutenant Colonel who served in both the Finnish Army and Imperial Russian Army. Hohenthal, who was of Swedish descent through his mother, moved to Sweden in 1944 and received Swedish citizenship in 1952.

References

1880 births
1966 deaths
Finnish male modern pentathletes
Russian male modern pentathletes
Olympic modern pentathletes of Russia
Modern pentathletes at the 1912 Summer Olympics
Finnish people from the Russian Empire
Finnish people of Swedish descent
Finnish emigrants to Sweden
Finnish military personnel
Military personnel of the Russian Empire
Naturalized citizens of Sweden